Miroqi ( or) is an urban-type settlement in Qashqadaryo Region, Uzbekistan. It is part of Shakhrisabz District. The town population in 1989 was 6421 people.

References

Populated places in Qashqadaryo Region
Urban-type settlements in Uzbekistan